Carlo Roberti de' Vittori (1605–1673) was a Roman Catholic cardinal.

Biography
On 8 Dec 1658, he was consecrated bishop by Giulio Rospigliosi, Cardinal-Priest of San Sisto Vecchio, with Cristofor Segni, Titular Archbishop of Thessalonica, and Marcantonio Oddi, Titular Bishop of Hierapolis in Isauria, serving as co-consecrators.

While bishop, he was the principal consecrator of: Jean d'Arenthon d'Alex, Bishop of Geneva (1661); and Giovanni Stefano Sanarica (Senarega), Bishop of Conversano (1671).

References

External links and additional sources
 (for Chronology of Bishops) 
 (for Chronology of Bishops) 

1605 births
1673 deaths
17th-century Italian cardinals
Cardinals created by Pope Alexander VII
Apostolic Nuncios to France
Apostolic Nuncios to Savoy